Walking with a Panther is the third studio album by American hip hop recording artist LL Cool J, released June 9, 1989, on Def Jam Recordings.

Background
While his previous album Bigger and Deffer (1987) was produced by The L.A. Posse,  Dwayne Simon was the only member left of the group willing to work on Walking with a Panther, as other members, such as Bobby "Bobcat" Erving, wanted a higher pay after realizing how much of a success the previous album had become. Def Jam, however, refused to change the contract, which caused the L.A. Posse to leave. Walking with a Panther was primarily produced by LL Cool J and Dwayne Simon, with additional production from Rick Rubin and Public Enemy's production team, The Bomb Squad.

Reception

Walking with a Panther was a commercial success, peaking at number six on the Billboard 200 and number one on the Top R&B/Hip-Hop Albums chart, where it spent four weeks. The album contained the singles "Going Back to Cali", "I'm That Type of Guy", "Jingling Baby", "Big Ole Butt" and "One Shot at Love", which also achieved chart success. Walking with a Panther, however, was met with a mixed response from the hip-hop community at the time of its release, which was un-favorable of several of the album's love ballads. Despite this, Walking With a Panther was well received by music critics. The album was certified platinum by the Recording Industry Association of America (RIAA).

Track listing
All tracks produced by LL Cool J & Dwayne Simon except where noted.

The cassette release had a slightly different track listing and two extra songs.

The vinyl version omits tracks 9, 10, 19 & 20.

Charts

Weekly charts

Year-end charts

Certifications

See also
List of number-one R&B albums of 1989 (U.S.)

Bibliography

References

1989 albums
LL Cool J albums
Def Jam Recordings albums
Albums produced by Rick Rubin